Sydney Chappell (13 November 1915 – June 1987) was a Welsh professional footballer who played as a half-back in the Football League for York City.

References

1915 births
Footballers from Bridgend
1987 deaths
Welsh footballers
Association football midfielders
York City F.C. players
English Football League players